The Uzbek language has been written in various scripts: Latin, Cyrillic and Arabic. The language traditionally used Arabic script, but the official Uzbek government under the Soviet Union started to use Cyrillic in 1940, which is when widespread literacy campaigns were initiated by the Soviet government across the Union. In Uzbekistan, it has been officially written in both the Cyrillic and Latin scripts since 1992. However, most people – both in Uzbekistan and neighboring Kyrgyzstan and Tajikistan – still use Cyrillic. In the Xinjiang region of China, some Uzbek speakers write using Cyrillic, while others use an alphabet based on the Uyghur Arabic alphabet. Uzbeks of Afghanistan also write the language using the Arabic script, and the Arabic Uzbek alphabet is taught at some schools in the country.

History

Arabic script 

Like all Turkic languages in Central Asia, Uzbek was written in various forms of the Arabic script such as Yana imla by the literate population.

Latin script 
Between 1928 and 1940, as part of comprehensive programmes to "educate" (politically influence) Uzbek people, who for the first time now had their own cartographically delineated (administrative) region, Uzbek writing was switched to Latin script (Yanalif; a proposal for the latinization of Yana imla was already developed in 1924). The Latinization of Uzbek was carried out in the context of Latinization of all Turkic languages.

Cyrillic script 
In 1940, Uzbek was switched to the Cyrillic script under Joseph Stalin:

Until 1992, Uzbek continued to be written using a Cyrillic alphabet almost everywhere, but now in Uzbekistan the Latin script has been officially re-introduced, although the use of Cyrillic is still widespread. The deadline in Uzbekistan for making this transition has been repeatedly changed. In 1993, President of Uzbekistan at the time Islam Karimov proposed a new Uzbek alphabet with ⟨c⟩ /ts/, ⟨ç⟩, ⟨ğ⟩, ⟨ɉ⟩, ⟨ñ⟩, ⟨ö⟩, ⟨ş⟩, until it was replaced with the current 1995 alphabet. The letter J with stroke is said to have been the equivalent of Cyrillic letter Zhje.

Education in many areas of Uzbekistan is in the Latin script, and in 2001 the Latin script began to be used on coins. Since 2004, some official websites have switched over to using the Latin script when writing in Uzbek. Most street signs are also in the new Latin script. The main national TV channel of Uzbekistan, Oʻzbekiston Telekanali (owned by MTRK), has also switched to the Latin script when writing in Uzbek, although news programs are still broadcast in Cyrillic script (compare with another TV channel owned by the same company, Yoshlar, broadcasts news programs in Latin script). Additionally, in Afghanistan Uzbek continues to be written in the Arabic script.

In 2018, the Uzbek government launched another reform effort for the Uzbek Latin alphabet. The new proposal called for replacing some digraphs with diacritical signs. In March 2021, the proposed changes were put up for public discussion and debate. They called for replacing Ch ch, Sh sh, Gʻ gʻ, Oʻ oʻ with Ç ç, Ş ş, Ḡ ḡ, Ō ō (and, in loans, Ts ts with C c). This would largely reverse the 1995 reform and bring the orthography closer to those of Turkish, Turkmen, Karakalpak, Kazakh (2018 version) and Azerbaijani. This was met with mixed reactions from the citizens. The proposal was put up again for discussion in May of the same year, this time with a deadline of 1 November 2021.

In February 2021, the Uzbek government announced that Uzbekistan plans to fully transition the Uzbek language from the Cyrillic script to a Latin-based alphabet by 1 January 2023. Similar deadlines had been extended several times.

Alphabetical order 
The current (1995) Uzbek Latin alphabet has 29 letters:

The symbol ⟨ʼ⟩ does not constitute a separate letter.

Correspondence chart 
Below is a table of Uzbek Cyrillic and Latin alphabets with represented sounds.

The Cyrillic letters Ё ё, Ю ю, Я я correspond to the sound combinations yo, yu, ya.

The Cyrillic letters Ц ц and ь (capital Ь occurs only in all-capitals writing) are used only in loanwords. In the modern Uzbek Latin alphabet ц becomes ts after vowels, s otherwise; ь is omitted (except ье, ьи, ьо, that become ye, yi, yo).

Notes

Distinct characters 

When the Uzbek language is written using the Latin script, the letters Oʻ (Cyrillic Ў) and Gʻ (Cyrillic Ғ) are properly rendered using the character , which is also known as the ʻokina.

The character  (tutuq belgisi) is used to mark the phonetic glottal stop when it is put immediately before a vowel in borrowed words, as in sanʼat (art). The modifier letter apostrophe is also used to mark a long vowel when placed immediately after a vowel, as in maʼno (meaning). Since this character is also absent from most keyboard layouts, many Uzbek websites use  or  instead.

Currently most typists do not bother with the differentiation between the modifier letter turned comma and modifier letter apostrophe as their keyboard layouts likely accommodate only the straight apostrophe.

Sample of the scripts
Article 1 of the Universal Declaration of Human Rights:

References

Alphabets used by Turkic languages
Cyrillic alphabets
Latin alphabets
Uzbek language
Arabic alphabets